Fullforce is a Swedish power metal band that formed in late 2008.

History
Fullforce was formed by former HammerFall members Stefan Elmgren and Magnus Rosen and Silent Memorial and Cloudscape singer Mike Andersson in late 2008. On May 27 they announced that current HammerFall drummer Anders Johansson had joined the band. On May 28 they announced that their final member will be Narnia and Beautiful Sin guitar player Carl Johan Grimmark. The band is signed to SPV. In January 2010 it was announced that Magnus Rosen has left the group, due to different reasons. Grimmark left the band and was replaced by Stefan Rosqvist. The band has toured with Edguy and recorded a follow up to One in the album Next Level (2012).

Band members

Current members
 Mike Andersson – Vocals (2008–present)
 Stefan Elmgren  – Guitar (2008–present)
 Anders Johansson – Drums (2009–present)
 Tommy Larsson - Bass (2010–present)
 Stefan Rosqvist - Guitar (2011–present)

Former members
 Magnus Rosén – Bass guitar (2008–2010)
 Carl Johan Grimmark  – Guitar (2009–2011)

Discography
One (2011)
Next Level (2012)

References

Musical groups established in 2008
Swedish power metal musical groups